Félix Deschange (9 August 1832, in Rouvrois-sur-Othain – ?) was a French republican politician. He was a member of the National Assembly from 1871 to 1876. He belonged to the Opportunist Republican parliamentary group,  Gauche républicaine.

References

1832 births
Year of death missing
People from Meuse (department)
Politicians from Grand Est
Opportunist Republicans
Members of the National Assembly (1871)